Rose Anna Summerfield (18 April 1864 – 14 April 1922) also known as Rose Cadogan or Rose Hummer, was a radical Australian feminist and labour activist.

Summerfield was born in Middleton Creek, Victoria (Australia); her father was Polish and her mother Irish. In 1886, she married Henry Lewis Summerfield, and they moved to Waverley in Sydney. They had one son in 1887. Summerfield's political activities began in 1886 when she joined the Australasian Secularist Association. Her interests included socialism, temperance and women's rights. In the early 1890s, she began writing political pieces for the Democrat, the Liberator, the Northern People, the Hummer and its successor, the Worker (Sydney). By 1892 she was the most prominent organiser of working women in Sydney and in August of that year established a women's division of the Australian Workers' Union.

On 17 July 1892, she delivered her most famous lecture to a Sunday evening meeting of the Australian Socialist League at Leigh House. In Master and Man, which she also called 'the gospel of discontent', she described the respective places of employer and workers under colonial capitalism, and how that would change if rights were afforded to workers. The piece has been described as an expression of narrative identity, identifying her subjective sense of self and alienation with the injustice inflicted upon women and the working class. Like many other radical writings at the time, it was also racist, portraying non-white people as a threat to the white working class.

Summerfield became involved with the Womanhood Suffrage League of New South Wales, establishing a branch in Waverly and serving on its council between 1893 and 1894. She was also active in the temperance cause.

Her first husband, Henry, died in 1890. Her second husband, John Cadogan, whom she married in 1897, was a cook and mine manager; they had four children together. By this time she had become disillusioned with Australian workers and labour politics, and she resigned from the Australian Socialist League. She and her husband left Australia for the utopian socialist settlement New Australia that had been founded in Paraguay by William Lane. It was there she gave birth in 1899 to León Cadogan, who made significant contributions to the study of Guaraní language and culture and is considered one of the most important ethnologists of Paraguay.

By 1901, she was dissatisfied with New Australia. She and John moved in 1908 to nearby Yataity and ran a store. She wanted to return to Australia, but her planned return in 1920 was called off when the couple lost their savings in a bank failure.

She died from cancer in Villa Rica, Paraguay, in 1922 and was buried in the Las Ovejas cemetery at New Australia.

See also
Australian labour movement

References

1864 births
1922 deaths
Australian suffragists
Australian trade unionists
People from Victoria (Australia)
Australian people of Polish descent
Australian people of Irish descent
Deaths from cancer in Paraguay
Australian emigrants to Paraguay
19th-century Australian women
20th-century Australian women